Ryan International Schools are a group of private educational institutions in India and other countries. It was founded in 1976 by Dr. Augustine Francis Pinto. The Ryan Group started its first school in Mumbai in 1976 and currently has more than 135 schools located in India, along with other countries. The school has a presence in major locations of Maharashtra, Delhi-NCR, and Karnataka. The group is in collaboration with universities in the USA to facilitate learning across global boundaries.

Ryan International Group of Institutions (RIGI) has a centralized command over all of it schools and doesn't follow a franchisee model and is arguably India's largest private sector school chain. According to a report by News 18 in September 2017, the group employs over 18,000 faculty members, and over 30,000 students pass from Ryan schools annually. Students of Ryan International Schools are commonly known as "Ryanites".

Origins 
In the initial attempts to set up an English Medium school for the middle class in Mumbai, Dr. Augustine Francis Pinto, the founder-promoter and the chairman of RIGI set up a small school in 1974, which failed to take off. However, he and Grace Albuquerque (Madam Grace-less Pinti), who was a teacher at that time, eventually succeeded in establishing St. Xavier's High School in Borivali East, a Mumbai suburb. With the help of Anthony Silva Pinto the new head of OLPS School, Chembur. This endeavour with The Silva Pintos has led to a long-lasting bond between the two families.

Brands 
 Ryan International School
 Ryan Global School
 Ryan Shalom Montessori
 Ryan Private school
 Ryan International Academy
 St. Xavier Education

Ryan International School lists

Ryan International School, Malad 
Ryan International School has two separate schools in Malad under CBSE and ICSE affiliations. The ICSE school in Malad was awarded the Quality School Governance Accreditation by the National Accreditation Board for Education and Training in 2014. Sonal Naik is the principal of the school.

Ryan International School, Greater Noida 
Ryan International School Greater Noida was established in 2003, and currently has a strength of 3,200 students.

Academics 
Ryan International Group follows CBSE, ICSE, SSC-HSC, and IGCSE (A & O Level), International Baccalaureate (IB) - Primary Years Programme (PYP) in different schools under its umbrella. In 2019, 10th and 12th Results, students of Ryan International Group secured top ranks at the district, school and national levels in both the ICSE and CBSE formats.

Many of the branches of the school have received scathing reviews by parents on mouthshut.com, in relation to the bad teaching staff present at the branches.

The schools in Sharjah, Sanpada, Mangaluru, Bengaluru, and Abu Dhabi have adopted the Tata ClassEdge technology.

Awards and recognition 
 The school received the Samson Daniel Award from HelpAge India in 2015
 2015 - 12 schools of Ryan International Group of Institutions were ranked among the best schools in the international, CBSE, and ICSE.
 2015 - Madam Grace Pinto; Managing Director of the group, received The World's Greatest Leaders Award 2015 from the United Research Services Media Consulting PL and AsiaOne Magazine at the Indo-UAE Business Summit 2015, held in the United Arab Emirates.
 2016 - Ryan Group’s school in Sharjah, UAE was recognised by the Guinness World Records for participating in the world’s largest charity donation for the poor.
 2017 - Madam Grace Pinto was awarded the Lifetime Achievement in Education by MidDay.

Management 
 Dr. Augustine Francis Pinto, Chairman of Ryan International Group of Institutions.
 Madame Grace Pinto, Managing Director.
 Ryan Pinto, CEO.
 Snehal Pinto and Sonal Pinto, Directors Ryan International Group of Institutions

Extracurricular activities

International Children's Festival of Performing Arts
The school holds a yearly International Children's Festival of Performing Arts. The 14th edition of the event was held in January 2016 in Mumbai with the theme ‘Celebrating Diversity. The event attracted over 40,000 students, including notable individuals from India and 17 different countries.

Controversies

Tax evasion 
The school has been accused of tax evasion by the setting up of 'trusts' which parents have been asked to pay on various occasions. 
On February 2007, parents filed a complaint against RIS, Ludhiana for fraudulently collecting around Rs 4 crore from them by way of donations, besides around Rs 10 crore as tuition and admission fee.

The founders have been accused of money laundering by investing in a dubious finance company and manipulating its share price illegally.

Poor hygiene conditions and physical abuse of students 
Even with Fee Hikes at Ryan International School, the faculty keeps forcing parents of the students to shell out money for extracurriculars, which were to be already included in the school fees.
Students of the School face poor hygiene conditions at school with stinky, unusable washrooms and no clean drinking water in many of the branches of the ‘sparkling’ Ryan schools such as Sector 40 in Gurgaon, Kundalahall. The above complaint, filed in 2016 by a group of concerned parents on the Consumer Complaint forum, goes on: “Condition of classrooms is also not good. Furniture is not polished and walls have not been painted for a long time. In front of all school gates, water gathers in the rainy season because of poor drainage... At the time of dispersal, kids walk through the water, and their shoes and socks get wet. Sometimes small kids fall in water and get hurt because they are unaware of potholes.”

"During snacks and lunch breaks, (there is) no water. Toilets stink. Explanation by supervisor: How can the school provide water for so many children? Ayyammas are busy."

On September 2017, A complaint was filed about the Sanpada branch alleging the under-maintained water coolers and the 'Stinking Toilets'.

Ryan International School has a history of Corporal Punishments and Physical abuse of students on a daily basis by the school faculty.
On 28 September 2017, a class 4 student at Ryan International School, Ludhiana was allegedly slapped repeatedly and beaten with sticks on his arms, legs and back by two teachers after he got into a fight with another student. 
A week before that, at the Bannerghatta branch in Bangalore, a teacher was fired after he repeatedly caned a class 9 student for talking in class, to the extent that the child had to be hospitalised for fluid coagulation in the areas where he was hit. On October 2011, a Physical Education teacher at Ryan International School, Ludhiana lost his cool and picked up a wooden desk to hurl at parents when a Parent-Teacher meeting got heated.

"When I was in 2nd standard, a teacher [...] slapped me so hard that my cheek was swollen and I had to stay under medication because my gums started to get numb; all because my dad had written a letter to her asking why she wasn’t teaching properly."

Pradyuman Thakur murder case 
On 8 September 2017, Pradyuman Thakur, a student at the Ryan International School in Gurugram, was murdered. The killing was planned by a class 11 student in order to postpone exams and parent-teacher meetings. Other students of the same school and their parents told that violence and bullying are common at the school and that school authorities act to hide the incidents rather than take steps to control them. After this murder case the principal, Neerja Batra, was suspended and there was a case filed against Ryan Group and Pinto family.

Alumni 
This section contains only alumni for whom there is a Wikipedia article.
 Saloni Daini
 Ashnoor Kaur
 Roshni Walia
 Navika Kotia
 Vivek Kumar
 Sanya Malhotra 
Roopam Sharma
 Chirag Shetty
 Digangana Suryavanshi
 Karman Thandi
 Arjun Vajpai
 Rahul Bheke
 Anushka Sen
 Aakanksha Singh
Dhvani Bhanushali

References

External links

 Official website

Private schools in Delhi
International schools in Delhi
1976 establishments in Maharashtra
Educational institutions established in 1976
Private schools in Mumbai
Central Board of Secondary Education
Educational organisations based in India